Asterix & Obelix Take On Caesar is an action video game developed by French studio Tek 5 and published by Cryo Interactive, which was released for the PlayStation, Game Boy Color and the PC.

Gameplay
The video game based on the film Asterix & Obelix vs. Caesar.

Reception
According to French newspaper Les Échos, Cryo's Asterix & Obelix game was a commercial hit, with sales of 200,000 units on the PlayStation by December 1999. By April 2000, this number had risen to 300,000 units.

GameGuru stated that "You're suppose to have reflexes to catch some mostly flying objects (like fish or baked pigs) and do something with them like bring them to the first free table. Very simple, and very boring."

Hardcore Gaming 101 said " imagine a whole game completely based on running and fetching objects. That is Astérix & Obélix Take On Caesar.  Yes in this game you rarely even meet the Romans at all, you spend your time serving wild boars to village people (not the band, even though these guys dress quite similar) or fetching misteltoes from trees. It's an absolutely baffling choice of gameplay, one that grows old pretty quickly and never starts being fun to begin with."

References

1999 video games
Action video games
Cryo Interactive games
Europe-exclusive video games
Multiplayer and single-player video games
PlayStation (console) games
Video games developed in France
Video games based on adaptations
Video games based on Asterix
Video games based on films
Video games set in France
Windows games